The 1973 Kansas Jayhawks football team represented the University of Kansas in the Big Eight Conference during the 1973 NCAA Division I football season. In their third season under head coach Don Fambrough, the Jayhawks compiled a 7–4–1 record (4–2–1 against conference opponents), tied for second place in the conference, lost to NC State in the 1973 Liberty Bowl, and outscored all opponents by a combined total of 253 to 220. They played their home games at Memorial Stadium in Lawrence, Kansas.

The team's statistical leaders included David Jaynes with 2,349 passing yards, Delvin Williams with 788 rushing yards and Emmett Edwards with 840 receiving yards. Jaynes set six conference passing records and was named the Big Eight Offensive Player of the Year. Don Goode and John Bryant were the team captains. Quarterback David Jaynes, became the first and as of the 2022 voting, the only Jayhawk to be a Heisman Trophy finalist, finishing in 4th place in the voting receiving 65 first place votes.

Schedule

Roster

Team players in the NFL

References

Kansas
Kansas Jayhawks football seasons
Kansas Jayhawks football